The 1952 Missouri Tigers football team was an American football team that represented the University of Missouri in the Big Seven Conference (Big 7) during the 1952 college football season. The team compiled a 5–5 record (5–1 against Big 7 opponents), finished in second place in the Big 7, and was outscored by all opponents by a combined total of 159 to 147. Don Faurot was the head coach for the 15th of 19 seasons. The team played its home games at Memorial Stadium in Columbia, Missouri.

The team's statistical leaders included Jim Hook with 741 rushing yards and 1,151 yards of total offense, Tony Scardino with 781 passing yards, Jim Jennings with 219 receiving yards, and Bill Rowekamp with 42 points scored.

Schedule

References

Missouri
Missouri Tigers football seasons
Missouri Tigers football